The Yale Russian Chorus is a tenor-bass choral ensemble at Yale University, established in 1953 by Denis Mickiewicz, a student at the Yale Music School, and George Litton, president of the Yale Russian Club. The group sings a variety of secular and sacred Slavic choral pieces (and non-Slavic pieces from the former USSR and neighboring regions), from the 12th century onward, including folk songs of Russia and Eastern Europe. The current musical director is Gabriel Mesa.

The YRC was the first American group to visit the Soviet Union as a private initiative, touring the country in 1958 following the signing of the Lacy-Zarubin Agreement on cultural exchange. The YRC made 16 tours to the USSR before the union dissolved in 1991. The ensemble tours domestically every spring.

The chorus rehearses for two and a half hours every week, holds concerts in and around New Haven throughout the academic year, and goes on an annual spring tour. Although the majority of its members are Yale undergraduate students, auditions are open to the entire New Haven community. As a tenor-bass chorus, membership is primarily male, but the chorus has also admitted women to sing in the tenor section.

The chorus has performed at many venues in Russia and Ukraine, and also many places in the United States, most notably:
Carnegie Hall in New York City
The White House (for President Bill Clinton)
The Smithsonian Institution
The Russian Cultural Center in Washington, D.C.
The Winter Garden Theatre in Manhattan
The radio show A Prairie Home Companion
The Alumni of the Yale Russian Chorus have formed a performing group in their own right to preserve the Mickiewicz tradition and presented a 60th Anniversary concert at Yale in November 2013. In November 2014 the Alumni of the Yale Russian Chorus performed at Rockport Music in Rockport, Massachusetts, at the Shalin Liu Performance Center in a shared performance with the Yale Slavic Chorus. The Yale Russian Chorus Alumni sang a full-length concert in April 2015 at St. Mary's Episcopal Church, Philadelphia, on the UPenn campus. Musical examples from a YRC alumni concert at Duke University in November 2009 include    Akh ty step shirokaya (Ах, ты степь широкая) ("O thou steppe so wide"),  Blazhen Muzh (Блажен муж) ("Blessed husband"),   Borodino (Бородино) ("Borodino" [a poem by M.Yu.Lermontov commemorating the battle against Napoleon's armies in the village outside Moscow]),   Kas Tie Tadi (Who Are They), and  Zhilo dvenadtsat razboinikov (Жило двенадцать разбойников) ("There were 12 robbers").

Foreign tours
USSR 1958
USSR 1959
USSR 1960
Western Europe 1962
Western Europe and USSR 1963
Eastern Europe 1968
USSR 1971
USSR 1977 (including Leningrad, Moscow, Tbilisi, Kiev)
USSR 1979
USSR 1982
USSR, Poland and Western Europe 1984
USSR and Western Europe 1987
Russia, Ukraine, Georgia 1990
Russia, Ukraine 1993
Russia 1994
Ukraine 1995
Russia 2004 (Alumni group)
Canada (Montreal/Quebec) 2009
Russia 2019

References

External links
Official website
Alumni website
YRC Exhibit at the Sterling Memorial Library
Khoristoria: The Story of the Yale Russian Chorus, a 2007 documentary

Collegiate a cappella groups
R
Musical groups established in 1953
1953 establishments in Connecticut